Erwin Dolera, Jomer Pabalan,  and Jayson Vann Banogan,  known collectively as the "Bangkang papel" boys (Paper boat boys), were three boys who received national recognition during the Arroyo Administration.

In 2001, the boys, who were survivors of the Payatas garbage slide tragedy of July 2000, wrote their dreams and wishes on papers which they then folded into paper boats and set afloat on the Pasig River downstream towards the Malacañan Palace as their symbolic gesture of bringing to then President of the Philippines Gloria Macapagal Arroyo their plight and aspirations. Although their paper boats never reached its intended destination, the activity, organized by an urban poor group, caught the attention of then-President Gloria Arroyo.

The plight of the boys touched the heart of the newly installed chief executive who presented them during her first State of the Nation Address (SONA). Arroyo invited the boys to the presidential palace and provided them with scholarship grants, livelihood, and other support services. In 2010, outgoing President Arroyo promised that the national Social Welfare and Development services will continue to provide educational assistance to the boys.

The succeeding Aquino administration assured continued aid for the three boys, even though Arroyo had informed the three that their scholarships will be only until 2010.

Two of the boys continued their studies with Dolera having taken a course in Mass Communication and Pabalan having taken a course in Information Technology.

On July 7, 2016, Dolera, who was working as a production assistant of News5 at the time, died at the age of 24 after two weeks of battling pneumonia and complications due to tuberculosis.

References

Living people
Trios
Poverty in the Philippines
Year of birth missing (living people)